Charles Gore (c. 1711 - 15 February 1768) of Tring Park, Hertfordshire, was a British landowner and Tory politician who sat in the House of Commons almost continuously between 1739 and 1768.

Early life
Gore was the eldest son of William Gore and his wife Lady Mary Compton, daughter of George Compton, 4th Earl of Northampton. He matriculated at Christ Church, Oxford on  12 July 1729, aged 18. In 1739 he succeeded to Tring Park on the death of his father. He was responsible for diverting the main Aylesbury to Berkhamsted road from a course through the park, which took it straight past the front door of Tring Park Mansion, to its present route following considerably flatter terrain further north.   He married Ellen Humfreys, daughter of Sir William Humfreys, 1st Baronet, of London, on 3 December 1741.

Career
 Gore was returned as Tory Member of Parliament for Cricklade at a by-election on 21 November 1739 caused by the death of his father. He voted against the motion for Walpole's removal in February 1741. At the 1741 British general election there was a double return at Cricklade and he withdrew there as he had also been returned unopposed as MP for  Hertfordshire. In 1742 he was one of the opposition Members proposed by the court to sit on the committee of inquiry into Walpole's Administration, although he was not elected to it. He continued to vote with the Opposition until the end of 1744 when he went over to the Administration with his uncle Thomas Gore. He was returned unopposed again in 1747.

At the 1754 British general election, Gore was returned for Hertfordshire  after a contest. There was another contest at the 1761 British general election, and as he had lost the support of the Dissenters, he was defeated. In May 1762 Newcastle  recommended Gore  to Nathaniel Ryder for a seat at Tiverton, where he was returned at a by-election on 14 May 1762. Gore was in poor health and spent the winter of 1764 to 1765 in France, returning to England in May 1765. By this time his appearance in divisions was sporadic and his political inclinations unclear.  He is not known ever to have spoken in the House.

Death and legacy
Gore died on 15 February 1768 leaving three sons and five daughters. He was the brother of Lieutenant-Colonel John Gore.

References 

1710s births
1768 deaths
British MPs 1734–1741
British MPs 1741–1747
British MPs 1747–1754
British MPs 1754–1761
British MPs 1761–1768
Members of Parliament for Cricklade
Members of the Parliament of Great Britain for Hertfordshire
Members of Parliament for Tiverton